This article lists the alumni of the University of Hawaii. Alumni who also served as faculty are listed in bold font, with degree and year in parentheses. An asterisk (*) shows those who attended, but did not graduate.

Academics, research, science and medicine

Arts, literature, journalism, and media

Athletics

Business
Richard D. Parsons (1968, B.A. history), former CEO and Chairman of Time Warner, Inc.

Government and international service

See also
List of University of Hawaii faculty

References

External links
 University of Hawaii Alumni Association (UHAA)

University of Hawaiʻi
Hawaii